This is a list of African-American newspapers that have been published in the state of Rhode Island.  It includes both current and historical newspapers.  

Relatively few African-American newspapers have been published in Rhode Island. The first known such newspaper, and the only one published in the 19th century, was John Henry Ballou's Eastern Review (1879–1880).  Rhode Island was thus the only state to show a net drop in African-American newspapers between 1880 and 1890, namely from 1 to 0, as Irvine Garland Penn recorded in The Afro-American Press and Its Editors.

In addition to its African-American newspapers, Rhode Island is the site of another important advancement in the history of the Black press: when John Carter Minkins became editor-in-chief of the Providence News-Democrat in 1906, he was the first African American to head a daily newspaper that catered to the white community.  Upon leaving the News-Democrat in 1911, Minkins purchased the weekly Rhode Island Examiner, which under his leadership gave front-page coverage to issues affecting African Americans.

Newspapers

See also 
List of African-American newspapers and media outlets
List of African-American newspapers in Connecticut
List of African-American newspapers in Massachusetts
List of newspapers in Rhode Island

Works cited

References 

Newspapers
Rhode Island
African-American
African-American newspapers